The 14th U-boat Flotilla (German 14. Unterseebootsflottille) was a short-lived unit of Nazi Germany's Kriegsmarine during World War II.

The flotilla was formed on 15 December 1944 in Narvik, Norway, under the command of Kapitänleutnant Helmut Möhlmann. It was disbanded in May 1945 when Germany surrendered.

Assigned U-boats
Eight U-boats were assigned to this flotilla during its service.

References 

14
Military units and formations of the Kriegsmarine
Military units and formations established in 1944
Military units and formations disestablished in 1945